Ben Lilly Conservation Area is a 247-acre tract of protected area located in Morehouse Parish, Louisiana, USA. The Louisiana Department of Wildlife and Fisheries (LDWF) became the new owner in 2013.

Name
The conservation area received its name from notorious big game hunter Ben Lilly, who was a guide for Teddy Roosevelt, when he hunted bear in the Tensas River swamp in 1907.

Description
The 247-acre conservation area is bordered by the 503-acre Chemin-A-Haut State Park to the north and Bayou Bartholomew makes a horseshoe boundary around the east, south and west sides. The conservation area is accessible through the state park from US 425, north of Bastrop, Louisiana, or by boat and a boat ramp is planned.

Shared name
The conservation area shares the name with the Ben Lilly campground located in the Gila National Forest.

References

Wildlife management areas of the United States
Wildlife management areas of Louisiana

Protected areas of Morehouse Parish, Louisiana